The Luo River is a tributary of the Yellow River in China. It rises in the southeast flank of Mount Hua in Shaanxi province and flows east into Henan province, where it eventually joins the Yellow River at the city of Gongyi.

Although not a major river by most standards, it flows through an area of great archaeological significance in the early history of China. Principal cities or prefectures located on the river include Lushi, Luoning, Yiyang, Luoyang, Yanshi, and Gongyi. The Luo's main tributary is the Yi River, which joins it at Yanshi, after which the river is called the Yiluo River.

See also
 Lo Shu Square
 Peiligang culture

External links

 Confluence of the Luo and Yellow Rivers

Rivers of Henan
Rivers of Shaanxi
Tributaries of the Yellow River